Alexandre Castonguay  (1968) is a Canadian media artist. He is known for his use of electronic and open-source technologies in his artworks.

Career
In 2005, Castonguay had a solo exhibition of his work at Musée d'art contemporain de Montréal. In 2009, his work was included in the Biennale de Montreal. He is a member of the Royal Canadian Academy of Arts. He is a professor at UQAM.

Collections
Castonguay's work is included in several major museum collections, including the Los Angeles County Museum of Art, the Musée national des beaux-arts du Québec, the Montreal Museum of Fine Arts and the National Gallery of Canada.

References

Canadian multimedia artists
Artists from Montreal
Living people
Members of the Royal Canadian Academy of Arts
1968 births